Stebbins Cold Canyon Reserve is a unit of the University of California Natural Reserve System and is administered by the University of California, Davis. It is within the Blue Ridge Berryessa Natural Area, in the Northern Inner California Coast Ranges.

It is located in Solano County and Napa County 10 km (6 mi.) west of Winters, California and 0.8 km (0.5 mi.) east of Monticello Dam on the south side of Putah Creek.

Natural history
Underlying the reserve are sedimentary rocks such as sandstones and shales. Most of the reserve is California interior chaparral and woodlands habitat, with some valley and foothill grasslands, blue oak woodland, mixed riparian woodland, and intermittent ephemeral foothill stream.

The reserve provides habitat for many wildlife species including 108 bird species, eight amphibian species, eighteen reptile species, 43 mammal species, and more than 290 plant species.

Current activities
The reserve is used for many types of research projects, educational outreach programs, and public recreation.

See also
Chaparral
Natural history of the California Coast Ranges
List of California native plants
Plant communities of California
Flora of California

References

External links
Official Stebbins Cold Canyon Reserve website

University of California Natural Reserve System
Protected areas of Napa County, California
Protected areas of Solano County, California
University of California, Davis
Vaca Mountains
California chaparral and woodlands
Natural history of the California Coast Ranges
Natural history of Napa County, California
Natural history of Solano County, California
Winters, California